This list of 1946 motorsport champions is a list of national or international auto racing series with a Championship decided by the points or positions earned by a driver from multiple races.

Open wheel racing

Touring car racing

See also
 List of motorsport championships
 Auto racing

1946 in motorsport
1946